Bemalkheda  is a village in the southern state of Karnataka, India. It is located in the chitguppa taluk of Bidar district in Karnataka.it is 40km from Bidar district.

Demographics
 India census, Bemalkheda had a population of 7716 with 3973 males and 3743 females.

See also
 Bidar
 Districts of Karnataka

References

External links
 http://Bidar.nic.in/

Villages in Bidar district